Drosera roseana is a species of pygmy sundew from Western Australia.

Carnivorous plants of Australia
roseana
Caryophyllales of Australia